Danielia Cotton (born Danielia Brooks on September 24, 1967) is an American rock singer, songwriter and guitarist.

Early life
Cotton grew up in the small western New Jersey town of Hopewell, New Jersey, population 2,010. She was one of four siblings raised by a single mother. Her mother, a jazz singer by avocation, supported the family doing accounting work. When Danielia was 12 years old, her mother gave her an acoustic guitar, she also started singing with her mom and her aunts in a gospel group, the Brooks Ensemble Plus. Growing up as one of only seven black kids in Hopewell Valley Central High School, she was not exposed to R&B and hip-hop. Along with her growing love for rock, Danielia developed a warm appreciation for jazz and gospel. Danielia wound up at the top of her high school class, the first to graduate from the New Jersey School of Performing Arts. Her vocal skills earned her a full scholarship to Bennington College. Danielia chose to pursue acting at Bennington and spent most of her senior year at the Royal Academy of Dramatic Arts in London. She doubled up on credits, so she could still study music, taking tutorials with avant garde jazz trumpeter-professor Bill Dixon, who, she says, "really trained my ear."

Music career

In 2005 Cotton released her debut album Small White Town (title inspired by Hopewell). Her second studio album, Rare Child, released May 20, 2008, was ranked in the top ten albums downloaded on iTunes during its first week of release. On July 7, 2009, she released the live EP Live Child, a companion piece to Rare Child. The EP won the 9th Annual Independent Music Award for the ‘Best Live Album’ and 'Live Performance Album Vox Pop' for the album "Righteous People". In 2012, Danielia released The Gun in Your Hand, followed by The Real Book in 2014. In 2017 she released The Mystery of Me, an album that features a mix of rock and soul, from the soaring "Set Me Free" to the deeply personal "Drink" and the upbeat "4 Ur Life," which pulls inspiration from classic Motown as well as Sly and the Family Stone. The album was covered by numerous media outlets including The New York Times.

Band members 
Danielia Cotton – Lead vocals, electric and acoustic rhythm guitars, songwriter
Marc Copely – Lead guitar, backing vocals
Winston Roye – Bass
John Clancy – drums

Discography

Studio albums
Small White Town – September 6, 2005 (Hip Shake Music)
Rare Child – May 20, 2008 (Adrenaline Records / Cottontown Records)
The Gun in Your Hand – October 30, 2012 (Redeye Label)
The Real Book – October 21, 2014 (Burnside / Cottontown Records)
The Mystery of Me – December 1, 2017 (Cottontown Records)
Good Day - March 18, 2022 (Cottontown Records)

EPs
Danielia Cotton – August 23, 2004 (Hip Shake Music)
Live Child – July 7, 2009 (Cottontown Records)
Woodstock – May 2, 2014 (Cottontown Records)
A Prayer – July 29, 2016 (Cottontown Records)
A Different War (Danielia Cotton & The Church Boys) – May 29, 2020 (Cottontown Records)

Singles
"Testify" (April 1, 2008)
"Forgive Me" (2017)

References

External links
Danielia Cotton's Official Website

 
Danielia Cotton at MSN music

African-American women singer-songwriters
African-American rock musicians
African-American rock singers
American rock songwriters
American rock guitarists
American women rock singers
American indie rock musicians
Hopewell Valley Central High School alumni
People from Hopewell, New Jersey
Living people
Independent Music Awards winners
1967 births
African-American guitarists
American musicians of Puerto Rican descent
Singer-songwriters from New Jersey
Guitarists from New Jersey
20th-century American guitarists
21st-century American women singers
African-American Jews
Converts to Judaism
21st-century American singers
20th-century American women guitarists
20th-century African-American women
20th-century African-American people
20th-century African-American musicians
21st-century African-American women singers